Senator White may refer to:

Members of the United States Senate
Albert Smith White (1803–1864), U.S. Senator from Indiana from 1839 to 1845
Edward Douglass White (1845–1921), U.S. Senator from Louisiana from 1891 to 1894
Francis S. White (1847–1922), U.S. Senator from Alabama from 1914 to 1915
Hugh Lawson White (1773–1840), U.S. Senator from Tennessee from 1825 to 1840
Samuel White (American politician) (1770–1809), U.S. Senator from Delaware from 1801 to 1809
Stephen M. White (1853–1901), U.S. Senator from California from 1893 to 1899
Wallace H. White Jr. (1877–1952), U.S. Senator from Maine from 1931 to 1949

United States state senate members
Al White (politician) (born 1950), Colorado State Senate
Albert B. White (1856–1941), West Virginia State Senate
Andrew Dickson White (1832–1918), New York State Senate
Benjamin F. White (Montana politician) (1833–1920), Montana State Senate
Bodi White (born 1956), Louisiana State Senate
Chilton A. White (1826–1900), Ohio State Senate
Daniel Appleton White (1776–1861), Massachusetts State Senate
Donald C. White (born 1950), Pennsylvania State Senate
Doug White (politician) (born 1943), Ohio State Senate
Francis White (Virginia politician) (1761–1826), Virginia State Senate
Frank White (North Dakota politician) (1856–1940), North Dakota State Senate
George E. White (politician) (1848–1935), Illinois State Senate
George Henry White (1852–1918), North Carolina State Senate
Harry White (Pennsylvania politician) (1834–1920), Pennsylvania State Senate
Hays B. White (1855–1930), Kansas State Senate
Horace White (1865–1943), New York State Senate
James T. White (politician) (1837–1892), Arkansas State Senate
James White (general) (1747–1821), Tennessee State Senate
Jeanette White (born 1943), Vermont State Senate
Jim White (politician) (born 1944), South Dakota State Senate
John E. White (1873–1943), Massachusetts State Senate
John L. White (1930–2001), New Jersey State Senate
Joseph C. White (1899–1967), Massachusetts State Senate
Kenneth S. White (1897–1976), Wisconsin State Senate
Loren H. White (1863–1923), New York State Senate
M. Z. White (1872–1945), West Virginia State Senate
Mary Jo White (Pennsylvania politician) (born 1941), Pennsylvania State Senate
Merritt F. White (1865–1934), Wisconsin State Senate
Michael D. White (1827–1917), Indiana State Senate
Michael R. White (politician) (born 1951), Ohio State Senate
Milo White (1830–1913), Minnesota State Senate 
Newton Harris White (1860–1931), Tennessee State Senate
Peter White (Michigan politician) (1830–1908), Michigan State Senate
Philo White (1796–1883), Wisconsin State Senate
Phineas White (1770–1847), Vermont State Senate
Randy White (West Virginia politician) (born 1955), West Virginia State Senate
Robert White (West Virginia state senator) (1876–1935), West Virginia State Senate
Roderick White (1814–1856), New York State Senate
Scott White (politician) (1970–2011), Washington State Senate
Stan White (politician) (fl. 2010s), North Carolina State Senate
Tom White (Nebraska politician) (born 1956), Nebraska State Senate
Walter L. White (1919–2007), Ohio State Senate
William White (Secretary of State) (1762–1811), North Carolina State Senate

See also
William Pinkney Whyte (1824–1908), U.S. Senator from Maryland